Cordova Mall, located in Pensacola, Florida, is the largest shopping center on the northwest Gulf Coast of Florida.

Opened in 1971 and renovated twice, in 1987 and 2008/2009, Cordova Mall comprises  of commercial property, with two major and six junior anchor stores. Five are situated in the mall (Dillard's, Belk, Dick's Sporting Goods,  Old Navy, and Ross Dress for Less), and three are located in an open-air atmosphere (Best Buy, Bed, Bath and Beyond and World Market). Until 2012, Dillard's operated two stores in the mall, which had been tenanted by D. H. Holmes and Gayfers. Montgomery Ward used to be located where World Market, Bed, Bath and Beyond, and Best Buy opened in 2001.

According to the Simon Property Group website, Cordova Mall is the third-most popular tourist destination in the Florida Panhandle, and serves eight million shoppers a year. 

Office Depot opened next to the mall in 1992 during Labor Day weekend.

The mall was damaged in a tornado on October 18, 2007, although no injuries were reported.

In 2012, Dillard's closed its store in the former D. H. Holmes, consolidating all operations into the former Gayfers building. As a result, Belk moved from its existing location (which was previously the first Parisian store outside of Alabama until 2007) to the former D.H. Holmes/Dillard's, and Dick's Sporting Goods taking over most of the store that had been Parisian and Belk. This also resulted in the closure of another Belk store at nearby University Mall (now University Town Plaza). On October 20, 2021, a retail shop called The SML Store had its grand opening.

See also 
 Bel Air Mall
 Pelican Place at Craft Farms
 Springdale Mall

References

External links

Shopping malls established in 1971
Simon Property Group
Shopping malls in Florida
Buildings and structures in Pensacola, Florida
Tourist attractions in Pensacola, Florida
1971 establishments in Florida